Michael Blumlein, M.D. (June 28, 1948 - October 24, 2019) was an American fiction writer and a physician. Blumlein attended medical school at the University of California, San Francisco and worked as a practicing doctor and member of the faculty at University of California, San Francisco for decades.

Most of his writing is in or near the genres of science fiction, fantasy, and horror. His novels include The Healer, The Movement of Mountains and X, Y. He has been nominated for the World Fantasy Award and the Bram Stoker Award. His short stories have been collected in anthologies and published in Interzone and The Magazine of Fantasy & Science Fiction, among others.

Bibliography

Novels
 The Movement of Mountains (1987)
 X,Y (1993)
 The Healer (2005)
 The Roberts (Tachyon Publications, 2011)
Longer (Tor.com, 2019)

Short fiction 
Collections
 The Brains of Rats (1988)
 What the Doctor Ordered (2013)
 All I Ever Dreamed (2018)
 Thoreau's Microscope (2018)

Stories

References

External links
Michael Blumlein.com
 

20th-century American novelists
20th-century American male writers
21st-century American novelists
American fantasy writers
American horror writers
American male novelists
Writers from San Francisco
Physicians from California
1948 births
American male short story writers
20th-century American short story writers
21st-century American short story writers
21st-century American male writers
The Magazine of Fantasy & Science Fiction people
2019 deaths